State Route 187 (SR 187) is a state highway in the U.S. state of California that runs along Venice Boulevard in Los Angeles from Lincoln Boulevard (State Route 1) in Venice to Interstate 10 in the South Robertson district.

Route description

Proceeding easterly, Venice Boulevard assumes the designation California State Route 187 at Lincoln Boulevard (State Route 1). The route then passes through the Mar Vista neighborhood. Further east, it  briefly forms the boundary between Palms and Culver City and passes near Sony Pictures Studios. Continuing northeast into the South Robertson neighborhood of Los Angeles, the SR 187 designation terminates at the intersection with Cadillac Avenue and the ramp carrying traffic from westbound I-10.

SR 187 is part of the National Highway System, a network of highways that are considered essential to the country's economy, defense, and mobility by the Federal Highway Administration.

History
Route 163 was defined in 1961 as a route from the ocean in Santa Monica to Route 173, routed along Pacific Avenue and Venice Boulevard. This was redefined as SR 187 in the 1964 state highway renumbering. In 1988, the part of SR 187 in Santa Monica was removed from the state highway system. The part of the route from the southern boundary of Santa Monica to Lincoln Boulevard was removed in 1994.

Future
According to Section 487 of the  California Streets and Highways Code, the entire length of Route 187 is eligible for relinquishment to the City of Los Angeles. If a relinquishment occurs, the state highway will cease to exist.

In popular culture
Rapper Snoop Dogg posed in front of a SR 187 sign in 1993, as a reference to Section 187 of the California Penal Code that defines the crime of murder and the song with Dr. Dre that he collaborated with (the shield has since been removed).

Major intersections

See also

References

External links

California @ AARoads.com - State Route 187
Caltrans: Route 187 highway conditions
California Highways: SR 187

State Route 187
Transportation in Culver City, California
187
187